Doris Nolan (July 14, 1916 – July 29, 1998) was an American actress best known for her Broadway roles and her appearance in the 1938 movie Holiday. She appeared in plays and films during the 1930s and 1940s. Later she moved to the UK, where she made guest appearances on British television shows.

Early years
Nolan was the daughter of Frank J. Nolan, who was a woolen goods importer. She began acting in high school in New Rochelle, New York. After graduation, she joined the Provincetown Players in 1933, working as the director's secretary to pay her tuition. The following summer, she joined the Clinton Hollow Theatre in Poughkeepsie, New York. Her acting as the female lead in The Late Christopher Bean there was seen by a talent scout, and that led to her getting a contract with Fox Studios.

Career
Nolan's first professional acting contract was with Fox Film Corporation, when she was 16 years old. She was given a small role in Our Little Girl with Shirley Temple, but after she botched her scene several times, Fox dropped her from the movie and gave her no more work.

She then switched to Broadway, where she achieved greater success. Although she was just 17, Nolan was cast as the female lead in Night of January 16th, produced by her manager Al Woods. She was nervous about playing the part of an older femme fatale who was the mistress (and possibly murderer) of a rich businessman. Despite her jitters, the show was a success and Nolan got positive reviews.

When Nolan left the play, Woods sent her back to Hollywood, getting her a contract with Universal Pictures. She continued to move back and forth between movies and theater throughout the 1930s and 1940s. Her most prominent film appearance was in the 1938 version of Holiday, where she played alongside Katharine Hepburn and Cary Grant. Her subsequent film roles went downhill, but she reinvigorated her Broadway career with an 18-month stint in The Doughgirls, a popular comedy play about the difficulties of life during World War II. It was  made into a film. Her final Broadway appearance was in The Closing Door, alongside her husband, who had written the play. It got poor reviews and closed after a few weeks.
 
After moving to the UK in the early 1950s, Nolan worked in regional stage productions and took guest parts on television series, such as The Saint, where she appeared in 1962 in "The Latin Touch", the second episode of the first season. Her final television appearance was in an episode of ITV's Brideshead Revisited serial in 1981.

Personal life
Nolan married Canadian actor Alexander Knox in a civil ceremony on December 30, 1944. The judge presiding over the wedding almost mistakenly pronounced her married to Knox's best man, but they stopped him and redid the vows. 
They had a son Andrew Joseph Knox (born 1947) who became an actor and appeared in Doctor on the Go and who was married to Imogen Hassall. In 1987 (when his career had nosedived), he boarded a Jersey ferry bound for the mainland to visit a friend in London. When the ferry docked, he was not on board. He is presumed to have either drowned accidentally or to have committed suicide.<ref>IMDB
Knox's political activity caused him trouble during the Hollywood blacklist, and the couple moved to the UK so he could continue working. She stayed in the UK until her own death on July 29, 1998.

Credits

Broadway

Film

Television

References

Works cited

External links
 
 
 
 Doris Nolan papers, 1930-1944, held by the Billy Rose Theatre Division,  New York Public Library for the Performing Arts

1916 births
1998 deaths
20th-century American actresses
American film actresses
American stage actresses
Actresses from New Rochelle, New York
American emigrants to the United Kingdom